Events from the year 1717 in Sweden

Incumbents
 Monarch – Charles XII

Events

 2 May - Battle of Göteborg 
 19 July - Battle of Strömstad

Births

  
 
 2 August - Karl Aurivillius, linguist, translator and orientalist  (died 1786)
 26 November - Olof af Acrel, physician and surgeon  (died 1806)
 
 Date unknown - Elisabeth Lillström, stage actress and opera singer (died 1791)

Deaths

 16 January - Elias Brenner, painter, numismatist, and archeologist (born 1647)
 23 February - Magnus Stenbock, military officer (born 1664)
 
 - Märta Berendes, courtier and memoir writer (born 1639)

References

 
Years of the 18th century in Sweden
Sweden